Urotherium is an extinct genus of Glyptodont. It lived from the Late Miocene to the Late Pliocene, and its fossilized remains were found in South America.

Description

This animal, like all glyptodonts, had a strong dorsal armor composed of numerous osteoderms fused together. The genus was characterized by an almost cylindrical caudal tube, obtuse and covered of small and raised osteoderms separated by wide and deep furrows. A pair of lateral osteoderms was preceded by other poorly differentiated osteoderms. The osteoderms of the carapace resembled those of the genus Trachycalyptus, remarkably wrinkled and strongly punctuated, with a barely distinct central figure, less dotted than the peripheral area. Compared to Trachycalyptus, the osteoderms of Urotherium were thicker and more rounded. In the species Urotherium simile, the osteoderms had lost their sutures and resembled those of Glyptodon.

Classification

The genus Urotherium was first described in 1926 by Castellanos, based on fossil remains found in Argentina found in Late Miocene-Early Pliocene terrains. The type species is Urotherium simplex ; another species, U. simile, was described in 1948 by Castellanos, and U. simile was later ascribed to the genus, having originally been described by Florentino Ameghino as belonging to another genus of glyptodont. The status of U. antiquus, another species, is disputed between the genera Neuryurus and Plohophorus.

Urotherium was a genus of glyptodont of uncertain affinities, variously placed within the tribes Neuryurini, Hoplophorini and Lomaphorini. It may have been the sister taxon of the genus Neuryurus.

Bibliography
Castellanos A. 1926. Sobre un nuevo gliptodóntido chapadmalense. Urotherium simplex n. gen. n. sp. y las formas afines. An Mus Nac Hist Nat Buenos Aires 60: 263-278. 
Castellanos A. 1948. La presencia del género "Urotherium" en el "Araucanense" del Valle del Yocavil (Santa María), provincias de Catamarca y Tucumán. Pub Inst Fisiogr Geol 35: 1-16.
Zurita, A.E., Taglioretti, M., De los Reyes, Martin., Cuadrelli, F., and Poire, D. 2016. Regarding the real diversity of Glyptodontidae (Mammalia, Xenarthra) in the late Pliocene (Chapadmalalan Age/Stage) of Argentina. Anais da Academia Brasileira de Ciências, 88:809-821.

Prehistoric cingulates
Prehistoric placental genera
Miocene xenarthrans
Miocene genus first appearances
Miocene mammals of South America
Pliocene mammals of South America
Pliocene xenarthrans
Pliocene genus extinctions
Miocene Argentina
Pliocene Argentina
Fossils of Argentina
Neogene Uruguay
Fossils of Uruguay
Fossil taxa described in 1926